A cryogenic storage dewar (named after James Dewar) is a specialised type of vacuum flask used for storing cryogens (such as liquid nitrogen or liquid helium), whose boiling points are much lower than room temperature.  Cryogenic storage dewars may take several different forms including open buckets, flasks with loose-fitting stoppers and self-pressurising tanks.  All dewars have walls constructed from two or more layers, with a high vacuum maintained between the layers.  This provides very good thermal insulation between the interior and exterior of the dewar, which reduces the rate at which the contents boil away.  Precautions are taken in the design of dewars to safely manage the gas which is released as the liquid slowly boils.  The simplest dewars allow the gas to escape either through an open top or past a loose-fitting stopper to prevent the risk of explosion.  More sophisticated dewars trap the gas above the liquid, and hold it at high pressure.  This increases the boiling point of the liquid, allowing it to be stored for extended periods.  Excessive vapour pressure is released automatically through safety valves.  The method of decanting liquid from a dewar depends upon its design.  Simple dewars may be tilted, to pour liquid from the neck.  Self-pressurising designs use the gas pressure in the top of the dewar to force the liquid upward through a pipe leading to the neck.

Safety 
Cryogens present several safety hazards and storage vessels are designed to reduce the associated risk.  Firstly, no dewar can provide perfect thermal insulation and the cryogenic liquid slowly boils away, which yields an enormous quantity of gas.  For example, the expansion ratio of cryogenic argon from the boiling point to ambient is 1 to 847, liquid hydrogen 1 to 851, liquid helium 1 to 757, liquid nitrogen 1 to 696, and liquid oxygen 1 to 860; neon has the highest expansion ratio with 1 to 1438.  In dewars with an open top, the gas simply escapes into the surrounding area.  However, very high pressures can build up inside sealed dewars, and precautions are taken to minimise the risk of explosion.  One or more pressure-relief valves allow gas to vent away from the dewar whenever the pressure becomes excessive.  In an incident in 2006 at Texas A&M University, the pressure-relief devices of a tank of liquid nitrogen were sealed with brass plugs. As a result, the tank failed catastrophically and exploded.

If a dewar is left open to the air for extended periods, atmospheric chemicals can condense or freeze on contact with the cryogenic material. This can introduce contaminants. If these materials freeze, for example, water vapor becoming ice, they can block the openings, leading to pressure buildup and the risk of an explosion.

The gas escaping from a dewar can gradually displace the oxygen from the air in the surrounding area, which presents an asphyxiation hazard.  Users are trained to store dewars only in a well-ventilated area and before transporting dewars in an elevator, the excess gas pressure is vented away and the dewars are sent unaccompanied to their destination.

References 

Vacuum flasks
Cryogenics
Industrial gases
Laboratory equipment